Joseph Clement Leonard Sexton (24 November 1905 – 21 April 1974) was a Labor member of the Australian House of Representatives from 1958 to 1966, representing the Division of Adelaide, South Australia.

Sexton gained preselection for Adelaide after sitting MP Cyril Chambers was expelled from the Labor Party for attacking the then leadership of H. V. Evatt in August 1957.

Sexton was defeated by Liberal candidate Andrew Jones at the 1966 federal election. He unsuccessfully sought Labor preselection to re-contest the seat in 1968, but was defeated by Chris Hurford.

Sexton died of a heart attack while on holiday in New Zealand in 1974.

Notes

Australian Labor Party members of the Parliament of Australia
Members of the Australian House of Representatives for Adelaide
Members of the Australian House of Representatives
1905 births
1974 deaths
20th-century Australian politicians